The 2001 UCLA Bruins softball team represented the University of California, Los Angeles in the 2001 NCAA Division I softball season.  The Bruins were coached by Sue Enquist, in her thirteenth season as head coach.  The Bruins played their home games at Easton Stadium and finished with a record of 62–6.  They competed in the Pacific-10 Conference, where they finished second with a 16–5 record.

The Bruins were invited to the 2001 NCAA Division I softball tournament, where they swept the Regional and then completed a run to the title game of the Women's College World Series where they fell to champion Arizona.

Personnel

Roster

Coaches

Schedule

References

UCLA
UCLA Bruins softball seasons
2001 in sports in California
Women's College World Series seasons